The Moa-class patrol boat was a class of patrol boats built between 1978 and 1985 for the Royal New Zealand Navy by the Whangarei Engineering and Construction Company. They were based on an Australian boat design.

Vessels of the class
Altogether there were seven vessels in the class

The lead vessel, Kahu, was initially named HMNZS Manawanui from 28 May 1979 to 17 May 1988. She was modified so she would function as a diving tender. After the commissioning of the dedicated Diving Support Tender HMNZS Manawanui (A09) she remained in service (as the Kahu) attached to the Royal New Zealand Naval College as the basic seamanship and navigation training vessel.

The next two vessels, Tarapunga and Takapu, were modified with their superstructure accommodation increased so they could function as inshore survey vessels. These were both decommissioned in the year 2000.

The last four vessels functioned as inshore patrol vessels for the Naval Volunteer Reserve. From 1994 these were modified to conduct mine countermeasures route surveying using side-scan sonar. This was used on several occasions for search-and-rescue or transport investigations. Kiwi relocated to Auckland during 2006. On relocating, the vessels' side scan sonars were removed.

With the introduction of the Project Protector ships, Moa, Kiwi, Wakakura and Hinau were replaced by four Protector-class inshore patrol vessels during 2007 and 2008. Kahu remained in service for seamanship and Officer of the Watch training until 2009.

References

Patrol boat classes